The Main Divide Cycle Race is a single day road cycling race run by Pegasus Cycling Incorporated held annually in late summer (though moved to late spring for the 2019 edition) in New Zealand. Starting from Darfield on the Canterbury Plains and running for 109 km to "The Main Divide" (908m) just north of Arthurs Pass Village. Along the way there is a King/Queen of the Mountains competition at the summit of Porters Pass (942m). Total vertical ascent for the race is 1,660m.

Past winners

References

Cycle races in New Zealand
Recurring sporting events established in 2003
Men's road bicycle races
2003 establishments in New Zealand